East Barre is a census-designated place (CDP) in the town of Barre, Washington County, Vermont, United States. The population of the CDP was 826 at the 2010 census. Prior to 2010, East Barre was part of the Graniteville-East Barre CDP, which consisted of three unincorporated villages in the town: Graniteville, East Barre, and Websterville.

Geography

References

Census-designated places in Vermont
CDP
Census-designated places in Washington County, Vermont